Guzmania mucronata is a plant species in the genus Guzmania. This species is endemic to Northern Venezuela.

References

mucronata
Flora of Venezuela